McClendon Jerrell Curtis (born September 16, 1999) is an American football offensive tackle for the Chattanooga Mocs.

Early life and high school
Curtis grew up in Chattanooga, Tennessee and attended Chattanooga Central High School, where he played football and basketball. He was rated a two-star recruit and committed to play college football at University of Tennessee at Chattanooga over UT Martin and offers from FBS programs Appalachian State, Georgia Southern, MTSU, Ohio, Temple, and Western Kentucky.

College career
Curtis redshirted his true freshman season at Chattanooga. He became the Mocs' starting right guard going into his redshirt sophomore year and start all 12 of the team's games. Curtis was named first team All-Southern Conference (SoCon) as a redshirt junior. He repeated as a first team All-SoCon selection as a redshirt senior after starting all of the Mocs' games at guard. Curtis decided to utilize the extra year of eligibility granted to college athletes who played in the 2020 season due to the coronavirus pandemic and return to Chattanooga for a sixth season. He moved to offensive tackle  during spring practices tackle. Curtis  won the Jacobs Blocking Award as the best blocker in the SoCon in his final season. After the conclusion of his college career, he played in the 2023 Senior Bowl.

References

External links
Chattanooga Mocs bio

Living people
American football offensive tackles
Chattanooga Mocs football players
Players of American football from Tennessee
1999 births